Isabela "Chabela" Romero Rangel (November 11, 1946April 19, 1985) was a Mexican professional wrestler. She was one of the first Mexican women to become a professional wrestler when women became a regular fixture in the early 1950s. During her career she won the Mexican National Women's Championship three times, and both the UWA World Women's Championship and the Japanese All Pacific Championship once.

Professional wrestling career
Women's wrestling in Mexico prior to the 1950s was almost non-existent, with no known matches taking place from 1945 on and very few prior to that. In the early 1950s Jack O'Brien began training female wrestlers, including Isabela Romero, in his gym in León, Guanajuato. She would work under the ring name Chabela Romero alongside other O'Brien trainees such as Irma González, La Enfermera, La Dama Enmascarada, and Rosita Williams. She made her in-ring debut on March 27, 1955, participating in an all-female tournament in Mexico City.

Romero won her first Mexican National Women's Championship at some point in the late 1950s, 1958 at the latest. Due to minimal written documentation from the time period it is uncertain as to who Romero won the championship from, nor who she lost it to. Records indicate that she started her second reign on December 6, 1965. In 1965 to 1966 Romero was involved in a storyline feud with Jarocita Rivero, that saw the two women trade the championship, first on May 12, 1966 and then back to Romero on August 11 of the same year. During the feud Jarocita Rivero defeated Romero in a Lucha de Apuestas ("Bet match"), which forced Romero to have all her hair shaved off as a result of the match stipulation. Records are uncertain as to when Romero's third and final reign as the Mexican National Women's Championship ended, as records are missing from late 1966 through 1980.

Over the years Romero had a long running storyline feud with Irma González, which included several Lucha de Apuestas matches between the two. Romero lost to González on June 20, 1971 and again on January 17, 1974, both times leaving the ring without hair. Romero ended up winning the mask of Princesa Azul, as a result of her Lucha de Apuestas victory on November 1, 1975. At some point in the 1970s Romero gained a measure of revenge as she defeated González in a Lucha de Apuestas in Panama. The two ladies also took their feud to Japan, working for All Japan Women's Pro-Wrestling for several tours throughout the mid-to-late-1970s. On May 20, 1978, Chabela Romero defeated Maki Ueda in the finals of a tournament to win the vacant All Pacific Championship. She held the title for 81 days, before losing it to Ueda on a show in Tokyo, Japan. On February 25, 1979, Irma González defeated Romero in their fourth and last Lucha de Apuestas match, on a Universal Wrestling Association (UWA) show. After the feud with González concluded Chabela Romero and Vicki Williams became involved in a feud, in which Romero defeated Vicki Williams to win the UWA World Women's Championship. The championship change led to a Lucha de Apuestas between the two as well, with Vicki Williams pinning Romero, forcing her to be shaved bald afterward. Chabela Romero ended up vacating the UWA World Women's Championship on April 19, 1981 for undocumented reasons.

Death
Romero died on April 19, 1985.

Championships and accomplishments
All Japan Women's Pro-Wrestling
All Pacific Championship (1 time)
Empresa Mexicana de Lucha Libre
Mexican National Women's Championship (3 times)
Universal Wrestling Association
UWA World Women's Championship (1 time)

Luchas de Apuestas record

Filmography
Doctor Doom (1963) (original title: Las luchadoras contra el médico asesino) as Carmela Camacho "Vendetta"
Wrestling Women vs. the Aztec Mummy (1964) (original title: Las luchadoras contra la momia) as herself
She-Wolves of the Ring (1965) (original title: Las lobas del ring ) as herself

References

1946 births
1985 deaths
20th-century Mexican actresses
20th-century professional wrestlers
Mexican film actresses
Mexican female professional wrestlers
Professional wrestlers from Puebla